The C&C 3/4 Ton is a Canadian sailboat, that was designed by Robert W. Ball as an International Offshore Rule Three-Quarter Ton class racer and first built in 1974.

The design was developed into the C&C 33-1 later in 1974, using the same hull design and sailplan.

Production
The boat was built on a "semi custom" basis by C&C Yachts in Canada and they completed 15 examples in 1974.

Design
The C&C 3/4 Ton is a small racing keelboat, built predominantly of fibreglass, with wood trim. It has a masthead sloop rig, an internally-mounted spade-type rudder and a fixed fin keel. It displaces  and carries  of ballast.

Operational history
The boat is supported by an active class club that organizes racing events, the IOR 3/4 ton Association.

See also
List of sailing boat types

Related development
C&C 1/2 Ton
C&C 33-1

Similar sailboats
Abbott 33
BB 10 (keelboat)
C&C SR 33
CS 33
DB-1
DB-2
Endeavour 33
Hunter 33
Hunter 33-2004
Hunter 33.5
Hunter 333
Hunter 336
Hunter 340
Marlow-Hunter 33
Mirage 33
Moorings 335
Nonsuch 33
San Juan 33S
Tanzer 10
Tartan Ten

References

Keelboats
1970s sailboat type designs
Sailing yachts
Sailboat type designs by Robert W. Ball
Sailboat types built by C&C Yachts